The STEN (or Sten gun) is a family of British submachine guns chambered in 9×19mm which were used extensively by British and Commonwealth forces throughout World War II and the Korean War. They had a simple design and very low production cost, making them effective insurgency weapons for resistance groups, and they continue to see usage to this day by irregular military forces. The Sten served as the basis for the Sterling submachine gun, which replaced the Sten in British service until the 1990s, when it, and all other submachine guns, were replaced by the SA80.

The Sten is a select fire, blowback-operated weapon which mounts its magazine on the left. Sten is an acronym, from the names of the weapon's chief designers, Major Reginald V. Shepherd and Harold J. Turpin, and "En" for the Enfield factory.
Over four million Stens in various versions were made in the 1940s, making it the second most produced submachine gun of the Second World War, after the Soviet PPSh-41.

History
The Sten emerged while Britain was engaged in the Battle of Britain, facing invasion by Germany. The army was forced to replace weapons lost during the evacuation from Dunkirk while expanding at the same time. After the start of the war and to 1941 (and even later), the British purchased all the Thompson submachine guns they could from the United States, but these did not meet demand, and Thompsons were expensive, the M1928 costing $200 in 1939 (and still $70 in 1942), whereas a Sten would turn out to cost only $11. American entry into the war at the end of 1941 placed an even bigger demand on the facilities making Thompsons. In order to rapidly equip a sufficient fighting force to counter the Axis threat, the Royal Small Arms Factory, Enfield, was commissioned to produce an alternative.

The credited designers were Major R. V. Shepherd, OBE, Inspector of Armaments in the Ministry of Supply Design Department at The Royal Arsenal, Woolwich, (later Assistant Chief Superintendent at the Armaments Design Department) and Harold John Turpin, Senior Draughtsman of the Design Department of the Royal Small Arms Factory (RSAF), Enfield. Shepherd had been recalled to service after having retired and spending some time at the Birmingham Small Arms Company (BSA).

The Sten shared design features, such as its side-mounted magazine configuration, with the Lanchester submachine gun being produced at the same time for the Royal Navy and Royal Air Force, which was a copy of the German MP28. In terms of manufacture, the Lanchester was entirely different, being made of high-quality materials with pre-war fit and finish, in stark contrast to the Sten's austere execution. The Lanchester and Sten magazines were even interchangeable (though the Lanchester's magazine was longer with a 50-round capacity, compared to the Sten's 32.)

The Sten used simple stamped metal components and minor welding, which required minimal machining and manufacturing. Much of the production could be performed by small workshops, with the firearms assembled at the Enfield site. Over the period of manufacture, the Sten design was further simplified: the most basic model, the Mark III, could be produced from five man-hours of work. Some of the cheapest versions were made from only 47 different parts. The Mark I was a more finely finished weapon with a wooden foregrip and handle; later versions were generally more spartan, although the final version, the Mark V, which was produced after the threat of invasion had died down, was produced to a higher standard.

The Sten underwent various design improvements over the course of the war. For example, the Mark 4 cocking handle and corresponding hole drilled in the receiver were created to lock the bolt in the closed position to reduce the likelihood of unintentional discharges inherent in the design. Most changes to the production process were more subtle, designed to give greater ease of manufacture and increased reliability, and the potentially great differences in build quality contributed to the Sten's reputation as being an unreliable weapon. However, a 1940 report stated that "Exaggerated reports about the unreliability [of the Sten] were usually related to the quality of manufacture. Don Handscombe and his comrades in the Thundersley Patrol of the Auxiliary Units rated them more reliable than the Thompson SMG." Sten guns of late 1942 and beyond were highly effective weapons, though complaints of accidental discharge continued throughout the war.

The Sten was replaced by the Sterling submachine gun from 1953 and was gradually withdrawn from British service in the 1960s. Other Commonwealth nations followed suit, either by creating their own replacements or adopting foreign designs.

Design
The Sten was a blowback-operated submachine gun firing from an open bolt with a fixed firing pin on the face of the bolt. This means the bolt remains to the rear when the weapon is cocked and on pulling the trigger the bolt moves forward from spring pressure, stripping the round from the magazine, chambering it and firing the weapon all in the same movement. There is no breech locking mechanism; the rearward movement of the bolt caused by the recoil impulse is arrested only by the mainspring and the bolt's inertia. 

The German MP40, Russian PPSh-41, and US M3 submachine gun, among others, used the same operating mechanisms and design philosophy of the Sten, namely their low cost and ease of manufacture. Though the MP40 was also built largely for this purpose, Otto Skorzeny went on record saying that he preferred the Sten because it required less raw material to produce and performed better under adverse combat conditions. The effect of putting lightweight automatic weaponry into the hands of soldiers greatly increased the short-range firepower of the infantry, especially when the main infantry weapon was a bolt-action rifle capable of only around 15 rounds per minute and not suited for short-range combat.

Stoppages could occur for poor maintenance, while others were particular to the Sten. Carbon build up on the face of the breech or debris in the bolt raceway could cause a failure to fire, while a dirty chamber could cause a failure to feed. Firing the Sten by grasping the magazine with the supporting hand, contrary to instruction, tended to wear the magazine catch, altering the angle of feed and causing a failure to feed; the correct method of holding the weapon was as with a rifle, the left hand cradling the fore piece.

The Sten's magazine, which, like the Lanchesters, derived from the MP28, originally to use its magazines, which incorporated the faults of the MP28 magazine. The magazine had two columns of 9mm cartridges in a staggered arrangement, merging at the top to form a column. While other staggered magazines, such as the Thompson, fed from the left and right side alternately (known as "double column, double feed"), the Sten magazine required the cartridges gradually to merge at the top of the magazine to form a column ("double column, single feed"). Dirt or foreign matter in this taper area could cause feed malfunctions. The walls of the magazine lip had to endure the full stresses of the rounds being pushed in by the spring. This, along with rough handling could result in deformation of the magazine lips (which required a precise 8° feed angle to operate), resulting in misfeeding and a failure to fire. If a Sten failed to feed due to jammed cartridges in the magazine, standard practice to clear it was to remove magazine from the gun, tap the base of the magazine against the knee, re-insert the magazine, then re-cock the weapon and fire again as normal. To facilitate easier loading when attempting to push the cartridges down to insert the next one, a magazine filler tool was developed and formed part of the weapon's kit. The slot on the side of the body where the cocking knob ran was also a target of criticism, as the long opening could allow foreign objects to enter. On the other hand, a beneficial side-effect of the Sten's minimalist design was that it would fire without any lubrication. This proved useful in desert environments such as the Western Desert campaign, where lubricating oil retained dust and sand.

The open bolt design combined with cheap manufacture and rudimentary safety devices also meant the weapon was prone to accidental discharges, which proved hazardous. A simple safety could be engaged while the bolt was in the rearwards (cocked) position. However, if a loaded Sten with the bolt in the closed position was dropped, or the butt was knocked against the ground, the bolt could move far enough rearward to pick up a round (but not far enough to be engaged by the trigger mechanism) and the spring pressure could be enough to chamber and fire the round. The Mk. IV's cocking handle was designed to prevent this by enabling the bolt to be locked in its forward position, immobilising it. Wear and manufacturing tolerances could render these safety devices ineffective. Though the Sten was somewhat prone to malfunction, in the hands of a well-trained soldier, who knew how to avoid the Sten's failings, they were less of a liability as otherwise may be suggested. According to Leroy Thompson, "Troops usually made the conscious choice to keep the Sten with a magazine in place, based on the assumption that they might need it quickly. It might, then, be argued that more troops were saved by having their Sten ready when an enemy was suddenly encountered than were injured by accident. The Sten was more dangerous to its users than most infantry weapons, but all weapons are dangerous".

Variants 

Sten guns were produced in several basic marks, of which nearly half of the total produced consisted of the Mark II variant. Approximately 4.5 million Stens were produced during the Second World War.

Mark I 

The first ever Mk I Sten gun (number 'T-40/1' indicating its originator Harold Turpin, the year 1940 and the serial number "1") was handmade by Turpin at the Philco Radio works at Perivale, Middlesex during December 1940/January 1941. This particular weapon is held by the historical weapons collection of the British Army's Infantry and Small Arms School Corps in Warminster, Wiltshire.

The Mark I had a conical flash hider and fine finish. The foregrip, forward handle and some of the stock were made of wood. The stock consisted of a small tube, similar to the Mark II Canadian. A design choice that was only present on the Mark I was that the pistol grip could be rotated forward to make it easier to stow. 100,000 Mark I Stens were made before production was moved to the Mark II. Mark I Stens in German possession were designated MP 748(e), the 'e' standing for englisch.

Mark I* 

To simplify production of the Mark I, the foregrip, wooden furniture and flash hider were removed with this variant.

Mark II 

The Mark II was the most common variant, with two million units produced. The flash eliminator and the folding handle (the grip) of the Mk I were omitted. A removable barrel was now provided which projected  beyond the barrel sleeve. Also, a special catch allowed the magazine to be slid partly out of the magazine housing and the housing rotated 90 degrees counter-clockwise (from the operator's perspective), together covering the ejection opening and allowing the weapon and magazine both to lie flat on its side.

The barrel sleeve was shorter and rather than having small holes on the top, it had three sets of three holes equally spaced on the shroud. To allow a soldier to hold a Sten by the hot barrel sleeve with the supporting hand, an insulating lace-on leather sleeve guard was sometimes issued. Sten Mk II's in German possession were designated MP 749(e). Some Mk IIs had wooden stocks. The Spz-kr assault rifle, a rudimentary German design made in the closing stages of the war, used the receiver and components from the Sten Mk II, and the MP 3008 was made as a cheap copy.
 Overall length: 
 Barrel length: 
 Weight:

Mark II (Canadian)
During World War II a version of the Sten gun was produced at the Long Branch Arsenal in Long Branch, Ontario (now part of Toronto). This was very similar to the regular Mark II, with a different stock ('skeleton' type instead of strut type). It was first used in combat in the Dieppe Raid in 1942.

The Mark II is made in China with a copy known as the M38. The Chinese M38s were made in an automatic-only configuration, unlike the standard Mark II. The M38 was made in 9×19mm and 7.62×25mm Tokarev variants.
 Overall length: 
 Barrel length: 
 Weight:

Mark III

After the Mark II, this was the most produced variant of the Sten, manufactured in Canada alongside the United Kingdom, with Lines Bros Ltd being the largest producer. The Mark III was made of 48 parts, compared to the Mark II's 69, but the Mark II remained more commonplace for logistical reasons – parts between the two were not interchangeable. Though slightly lighter, the magazine well was fixed in place, and the barrel could not be removed, meaning if it was damaged the weapon had to be scrapped. Combined with the fact the Mark III was more prone to failure than the Mark II, production of the weapon ceased in September 1943. Unlike the Mark II, the receiver, ejection port, and barrel shroud were unified, leading to them being extended further up the barrel. Captured Sten Mk III's in German possession were designated MP 750(e). A total of 876,886 Mark III's were produced.

Mark V

The Mark V added a bayonet mount, and a wooden pistol grip and stock. There was a No. 4 Lee–Enfield rear sight and the weapon was of better quality manufacture and finish than the Mk II and Mk III.

Another variant of the Mk V had a swivel stock and rear sight mirror intended for firing around corners in urban warfare, similar to the Krummlauf developed by the Germans for the StG 44.

Suppressed models

Mk II(S) and Mk VI models incorporated an integral suppressor and had a lower muzzle velocity than the others due to a ported barrel intended to reduce velocity to below the speed of sound –  – without needing special ammunition. The suppressor heated up rapidly when the weapon was fired, and a canvas cover was laced around the suppressor for protection for the firer's supporting hand.

 Mk II(S) Designed in 1943, the Mk II(S) ("Special-Purpose") was an integrally suppressed version of the Mk II. Captured examples of the Sten Mk II(S) in German service were designated MP 751(e).
 Mk VI The Mk VI was a suppressed version of the Mk V. The Mk VI was the heaviest version due to the added weight of the suppressor, as well as using a wooden pistol grip and stock.

The suppressed models were produced at the request of the Special Operations Executive (SOE) for use in clandestine operations in occupied Europe, starting with the Mk II(S) in 1943. Owing to their tendency to overheat, they were fired in short bursts or single shots. Some guns were even changed to semi-automatic only.

In addition to its use in the European theatre, the Mk II(S) saw service with clandestine units in the Southwest Pacific Area (SWPA) such as the Services Reconnaissance Department and SOE's Force 136 on operations against the Imperial Japanese Army. The Sten Mk II(S) was used by the Operation Jaywick party during their raid into Japanese-occupied Singapore Harbour.

The Sten Mk II(S) also saw service with the Special Air Service Regiment during the Vietnam War.

Experimental models 

 Mark II (wooden stock model) This was a standard Sten Mk.II  with a wooden stock attached in place of the wireframe steel stock used with Mk.IIs. This wooden stock model was never put into service;  likely due to the cost of producing it.
 Mark II (Rosciszewski model) This was a Sten Mk.II modified by Antoni Rosciszewski of Small Arms Ltd. The magazine was mechanically operated by the breech block movement. The trigger was split into two sections, with the upper part of the trigger offering full-auto fire and a lower part offering single shots. It was very complex in design and never fielded.
 Mark II (pistol grip model) This was a Sten Mk.II with a wireframe pistol grip, intended for use with paratroopers. It was compact but predictably uncomfortable to fire.
 Model T42 This was a Sten Mk.II modified with a 5-inch barrel and folding stock, as well as a conventional pistol grip and redesigned trigger guard. It was dubbed the "T42" in prototype phases, but never entered service.
 Mark IV The Mark IV was a smaller variant of the Sten, comparable in size to a pistol, and never left the prototype stage. It used a conical flash hider, a shortened barrel, and a much lighter stock.
 Rofsten Developed at the Royal Ordnance Factory in Fazakerley (ROF Fazakerley), the Rofsten was an odd Sten prototype with a redesigned magazine feed, ergonomic pistol grip, selector switch and cocking system. The weapon was cocked by pulling the small ring above the stock. A large flash eliminator was fixed onto the barrel, and a No.5 bayonet could be fixed. It was made to a very high quality standard and had an increased rate of fire (around 900 rounds per minute). The Rofsten was made in 1944 as a single prototype and ROF wanted to submit it to trials the next year. Despite better quality there were numerous reliability problems due to the much higher rate of fire. The budget cuts prevented the modifications and this version never got beyond the prototype stage.
 Viper mk1 This version simplified the weapon, including the trigger mechanism and barrel which was welded to the gun making it not removable. The weapon was also fully automatic and there was no semi-automatic function on the gun. It was made in the United Kingdom after World War II and was a prototype weapon never used as it was deemed impractical. It was designed for military policeman in post-war Germany to be fired one-handed. Only one was ever made and it is currently held at the Royal Armouries Museum in Leeds, United Kingdom.

Foreign-built variants and post-1945 derivatives 

 
 Argentina Sten MkIIs were licence-copied in Argentina by Pistola Hispano Argentino and can be recognised with a wooden handguard in front of the trigger group. It was known as the Modelo C.4. Another variant came with a pistol grip section based on the Ballester–Molina .45 pistol. The Halcon ML-57 was a simpler derivative of the Sten gun of Argentine origin that was fed from a vertically inserted magazine.
 Israel Copies of the Sten Mk II and Sten Mk V were clandestinely manufactured in Tel Aviv and on various kibbutzim in 1945–48 for use with Haganah and other Jewish paramilitary groups.
 France The French "Gnome et Rhône" R5 Sten, manufactured by the motorbike and aeroplane engine manufacturer Gnome et Rhône (SNECMA), came with a forward pistol grip and distinctive wooden stock, although its greatest improvement was a sliding bolt safety, added to secure the bolt in its forward position. Another variant made by MAC (Manufacture d’armes de Châtellerault), were made and tested shortly after WWII. One variant had an unusual stock shape that proved detrimental to the firer's aim. Internally it was basically a Sten gun but had two triggers for semi/full auto, a grip safety and a foregrip that used MP40 magazines. Another had a folding stock with a folding magazine insert. The trigger mechanism was complicated and unusual. Neither of these prototypes had any kind of success and MAC closed its doors not long after their conception. The French were not short of SMGs after the war; they had some 3,750 Thompsons and Stens, as well as MAS 38s.
 Norway The Norwegian resistance, under the leadership of Bror With, created a large number of Sten guns from scratch, mainly to equip members of the underground army Milorg. In his autobiography, Norwegian resistance fighter Max Manus frequently mentions the Sten as one of the weapons his groups of commandos and resistance fighters used effectively against German troops.
 Denmark Several groups in the Danish resistance movement manufactured Sten guns for their own use. BOPA produced around 200 in a bicycle repair shop on Gammel Køge landevej (Old Køge road), south of Copenhagen. Holger Danske produced about 150 in workshops in Copenhagen, while employees of the construction company Monberg & Thorsen built approximately 200–300 in what is now the municipality of Gladsaxe (a suburb of Copenhagen) for use by Holger Danske and others. The resistance groups 'Frit Danmark' and 'Ringen' also built significant numbers of Stens.
 Poland From 1942 and 1944, approximately 11,000 Sten Mk IIs were delivered to the Armia Krajowa by the SOE and Cichociemni. Polski Stens made in Warsaw under the command of Ryszard Białostocki were built from parts made in official factories, with the main body of the design being made from hydraulic cylinders produced for hospital equipment. To help disguise their origin, the Polski Stens were marked in English.
 Belgium A little known version of the MkII Sten was built in Belgium by l'arsenale militare belga (the Belgian military arsenal).  The magazine well was stamped AsArm (the manufacturer),  ABL (for Armée Belge Belgisch Leger), the Belgian Royal Crown and a serial number of typically five figure with no letter prefix.  It is believed the Belgian built Mk II Stens remained in ABL service until the early 1980s, particularly with helicopter-borne forces.  Some of the weapons had a "Parkerised" finish. After the Second World War the Belgian Army was mainly equipped with a mixture of British and American submachine guns. The army, wanting to replace them with a modern and preferably native design, tested various designs with the Vigneron M2 and licence-produced FN Uzi being selected. However, the Imperia was an improved Sten with a fire selector and retractable stock.
 Germany In late 1944, Mauser began to produce copies of the Mk II Sten for sabotage purposes. The series was referred to as the Gerät Potsdam (Potsdam Device) and almost 10,000 weapons were made. By 1945, Germany was seeking a cheaper replacement for the MP40 submachine gun to issue to the Volkssturm. Mauser produced a modified Sten, named the MP 3008. The main difference was that the magazine attached below the weapon. Altogether, roughly 10,000 were produced in early 1945, just before the end of World War II.
 Australia The Mark I Austen submachine gun ("Australian Sten") was an Australian design, derived from the Sten and manufactured by the Lithgow Small Arms Factory. It externally resembled the Sten but had twin pistol grips and folding stock resembling those of the German MP40. Australian and NZ troops however preferred the Owen gun which was more reliable and robust in jungle warfare. A Mk 2 version was also produced which was of different appearance and which made more use of die-cast components. 20,000 Austens were made during the war and the Austen was replaced by the F1 submachine gun in the 1960s.
 United States A short-lived American invention developed in the 1980s, the Sputter Gun was designed to circumvent the law that defined a machine gun as something that fired multiple rounds with one pull of the trigger. The Sputter Gun had no trigger, but fired continuously after loading and the pulling back of its bolt, firing until it ran out of ammunition. The gun was very short lived as the ATF quickly reclassified it. During the 1970s-1980s, International Ordnance of San Antonio, Texas, United States released the  machine pistol. It was intended as a more compact, simpler derivative of the British Sten gun to be used in urban guerrilla actions, to be manufactured cheaply and/or in less-than-well-equipped workshops and distributed to "friendly" undercover forces. Much like the FP-45 Liberator pistol of World War II, it could be discarded during an escape with no substantial loss for the force's arsenal. The MP2 is a blowback-operated weapon that fires from an open bolt with an extremely high rate of fire.
 Guatemala The  is a machine pistol of Guatemalan origin and manufactured by Cellini-Dunn IMG, Military Research Corp and Wildfire Munitions as the SM-90. It is blowback operated, firing from an open bolt and can use magazines from Ingram MAC-10 submachine guns inserted into a similar foregrip that can be rotated 45 and 90 degrees for left/right handed operators. The layout of the receiver is somewhat simpler than that of a Sten with its internal components light in weight enabling a very high rate of fire of 1200rpm. Its forward pistol grip can hold a spare magazine as well as handling the weapon when firing.
 Croatia The Pleter submachine gun was created in 1991 when the breakup of Yugoslavia in the midst of emerging war left the newly formed Republic of Croatia with small number of military firearms. Since the embargo prevented the Croatian military from legally buying them on open market (so they were mostly obtained on the world black market, but with significantly higher price and sometimes of questionable quality), to fulfill the immediate need for arms, they tried to resort on quick and simple locally made designs. Despite having a vertical magazine well (designed to accept 32-round staggered-feed direct copy of UZI magazine, rather than original single-feed Sten-type magazine), analogies with the Sten include a striking resemblance in the barrel assembly and in the bolt and recoil spring. In addition, this gun also fires from an open bolt, and is further simplified by removing fire mode selector or any safety.
 Canada SMG International in Canada manufactured reproductions of the Sten in six variants. They made copies of the Sten's Mk 1*, Mk II and Mk III, a "New Zealand Sten" (a Mk II/III Sten hybrid, with sights and a fixed magazine housing similar to the Mk III), then branched out into "hypothetical" Sten-guns with a "Rotary Magazine Sten" (a Mk II Sten with a drum magazine attached below the weapon and wooden horizontal forward grip on the left side of the weapon) and the "FRT Gun" (a long barrel Sten with a wooden or Mk 1* type butt stock, a drum magazine attached below the weapon and sliding ramp rear sights). These last two being obviously not Sten reproductions, especially if they included a drum magazine.  The "Rotary Magazine Sten" is a vertically fed Sten which uses a modified Sten bolt, which can use either PPSh drum magazines or stick magazines. The FRT gun is essentially a Suomi that uses a Sten trigger mechanism.  All SaskSten guns fire from an open bolt.

Conversions
The Sten MKII can be converted to take 7.62x25mm ammo by changing the barrel, magazine, magazine housing and bolt.https://smallarmsreview.com/magnum-sten/ Some of them were imported to the US before 1968. These MKIIs were made by Long Branch as part of a Nationalist Chinese contract.

While all types of 7.62x25mm ammo can be used, those made in the former Czechslovakia are made for small arms that can handle high velocity, so users are not advised to use them.

Service
The Sten, especially the Mark II, tended to attract affection and loathing in equal measure. Its peculiar appearance when compared to other firearms of the era, combined with sometimes questionable reliability made it unpopular with some front-line troops. It gained nicknames such as "Plumber's Nightmare", "Plumber's Abortion", or "Stench Gun". The Sten's advantage was its ease of mass-production manufacture in a time of shortage during a major conflict.

Made by a variety of manufacturers, often with subcontracted parts, some early Sten guns were made poorly and/or not to specification, and could malfunction in operation, sometimes in combat. The double-column, single-feed magazine copied from the German MP28 was never completely satisfactory, and hasty manufacturing processes often exacerbated the misfeed problems inherent in the design. A common statement heard from British forces at the time was that the Sten was made "by Marks and Spencer out of Woolworth." British and Commonwealth forces in the early years of the war often extensively test-fired their weapons in training to weed out bad examples; a last-minute issue of newly manufactured Stens prior to going into action was not always welcomed.

The MK II and III Stens were regarded by many soldiers as very temperamental, and could accidentally discharge if dropped or even laid on the ground whilst the gun was cocked. Others would fire full-automatic when placed on 'single', or fire single shots when placed on 'automatic'. This was particularly true of early Stens using bronze bolts, where the sear projection underneath the bolt could wear down more easily than ones made of case-hardened steel.

Stens could jam at inopportune moments. One of the more notable instances of this was the assassination of SS–Obergruppenführer Reinhard Heydrich on 27 May 1942, when Czechoslovak Warrant Officer Jozef Gabčík wanted to fire his Sten point blank at Heydrich, only to have it misfire. His comrade Jan Kubiš then hastily tossed a grenade, which mortally wounded Heydrich. There are other accounts of the Sten's unreliability, some of them true, some exaggerated and some apocryphal. France manufactured (well-made) Sten copies postwar into the early 1950s, evidently believing in the basic reliability and durability of the design.

A well-maintained (and properly functioning) Sten gun was a devastating close-range weapon for sections previously armed only with bolt-action rifles. In addition to regular British and Commonwealth military service, Stens were air-dropped in quantity to resistance fighters and partisans throughout occupied Europe. Due to their slim profile and ease of disassembly/reassembly, they were good for concealment and guerrilla warfare. Wrapping the barrel in wet rags would delay undesirable overheating of the barrel. Guerrilla fighters in Europe became adept at repairing, modifying and eventually scratch-building clones of the Sten (over 2,000 Stens and about 500 of the similar Błyskawica SMGs were manufactured in occupied Poland).

Canadian infantry battalions in northwest Europe retained spare Sten guns for special missions and the Canadian Army reported a surplus of the weapons in 1944.
The Sten saw use even after the economic crunch of World War II, replacing the Royal Navy's Lanchester submachine guns into the 1960s, and was used in the Korean War, including specialist versions for British Commandos. It was slowly withdrawn from British Army service in the 1960s and replaced by the Sterling SMG; Canada also phased out the Sten, replacing it with the C1 SMG.

The Sten was one of the few weapons that the State of Israel could produce domestically during the 1948 Arab–Israeli War. Even before the declaration of the State of Israel, the Yishuv had been producing Stens for the Haganah; after the declaration, Israel continued making Stens for IDF use. The opposing side also used (mostly British-made) Stens, particularly the irregular and semi-regular Arab Liberation Army.

In the 1950s, "L numbering" came into use in the British Army for weapons—Stens were then known as L50 (Mk II), L51 (Mk III) and L52 (Mk V).

One of the last times the Sten was used in combat during British service was with the RUC during the IRA border campaign of 1956–1962. In foreign service, the Sten was used in combat at least as recently as the Indo-Pakistani War of 1971.

Sten guns were widely used by guerrilla fighters during the 1971 Bangladesh Liberation War. In 1975, President Sheikh Mujibur Rahman and his family members were assassinated using Sten guns.  

A number of suppressed Stens were in limited use by the US Special Forces during the Vietnam War, including c. 1971, by the United States Army Rangers.

In 1984, Indian prime minister Indira Gandhi was assassinated by two of her bodyguards, one of whom fired the entire magazine (30 rounds) of his Sten at point-blank range, of which 27 hit her.

In the Second Sino-Japanese War and the Chinese Civil War, both nationalists and communist Chinese forces used the Sten. Some Stens were converted by the communists to 7.62×25mm by using the magazine housing from a PPS to accept curved PPS magazines. British, Canadian, and Chinese Stens were seen in the hands of the communists during the Korean and Vietnam Wars.

The Finnish Army acquired moderate numbers of Stens in the late 1950s, mainly Mk. III versions. Refurbishment at the Kuopio Arsenal included bluing of the arms. Stens in Finnish service saw limited usage by conscripts (notably combat swimmers) and were mostly stockpiled for use in a future mobilization.

During the Zapatista movement in 1994, some Zapatista soldiers were armed with Sten guns.

Users

 : Used by the Albanian National Liberation Army during World War II. The weapons were supplied by the British SOE.
  FNLA
 : Modelo C.4..
 : Locally produced during World War II.
 : Extensively used during 1971 war.
 
 
 
 : Locally produced during World War II.
 : Central African Republic Police had 10 Stens in 1963
 
  Republic of the Congo (Léopoldville)
 
 : Fidel Castro praised the Canadian Sten gun in his 1958 interview with Erik Durschmied 
 
 : Most used by communist forces had their Stens converted to 7.62x25 caliber.
 
 : Used by Czechoslovak troops for Operation Anthropoid, the assassination of Reinhard Heydrich. The gun jammed and failed to fire.
 : Used by the Danish resistance movements like BOPA and Holger Danske. Locally produced.
 
 : 76 115 MK 2s and 3s bought in 1957–1958; used until replaced by assault rifles.
 : Used during World War II by the Free French forces, the French Resistance and some captured from the Resistance were used by the pro-German Milice française. Still used after World War II.
 
 
 
 
 : Used in the 1947–1949 Palestine war and the Suez Crisis.
  Sten guns were supplied to the Italian resistance movement by the SOE, along with the United Defense M42 submachine gun supplied by the OSS during the Italian Campaign. These guns, along with the Berretta M38A, were used by the Italian partisans until the end of World War II.
 
 : Arab Legion
 : Used by the regular police paramilitary GSU, army paratroopers; replaced by G3A3/4, M4 and HK416.
  Kingdom of Laos: Used by the Royal Lao Army and the CIA-sponsored irregular Special Guerrilla Groups during the Laotian Civil War.
 
 
 : Used by Royal Malaysia Police, Malaysian Army, Royal Malaysian Navy and Malaysian Prison Department in 1950s to 1970s.
 
 : Retired.
 : Still in service in 2006.
 
 : Used some captured Stens during World War II, under the designations MP 748 (e) for the Mark I to MP 751 (e) for the Mark V. From late 1944, they produced an almost identical copy for home defence: the MP 3008.
 
 
 : Used by the Norwegian resistance from 1940–1945. The guns came to the resistance groups by air (supply drops). Used by the Army after the war.
 
 : Used by the Recognized Guerrilla Units during World War II.
 : Used by Polish Armed Forces in the West and main resistance army in occupied Poland, the Armia Krajowa (Home Army). The majority of the resistance's Stens were dropped to Poland in SOE supply drops, but some of the Polish Stens were produced in the occupied country. Polish engineers also designed their own Sten version, the Błyskawica submachine gun. After the war, it was used by many anti-communist partisan groups (cursed soldiers).
 : Known as m/43.
 
 
 
 : Used by SWAPOL during the South African Border War.
 
 
 : The Tibetan Army purchased 168 guns in 1950.
 
 
 : Suppressed Stens used during the Vietnam War by American special forces.
 : Việt Minh and Viet Cong
 : Used by the Yugoslav Partisans and Chetniks. Also used after the war.

Non-state groups
 The Provisional IRA and Official IRA
 The Ulster Volunteer Force and Ulster Freedom Fighters
 Balcombe Street Gang
 The Angry Brigade
 Some were supplied to the Bulgarian Communist Party during WWII

Notes

References

External links

 "Sten Gun to be forerunner of invasion" September 1943 detailed article in Popular Science
 Complete machinist's plans to manufacture a Sten Mk II
 Sten at Modern Firearms

9mm Parabellum submachine guns
Insurgency weapons
Simple blowback firearms
Submachine guns of the United Kingdom
Weapons and ammunition introduced in 1941
World War II infantry weapons of Australia
World War II infantry weapons of China
World War II infantry weapons of the United Kingdom
World War II submachine guns